Neblinantha is a genus of flowering plants belonging to the family Gentianaceae.

Its native range is Venezuela to Northern Brazil.

Species:

Neblinantha neblinae 
Neblinantha parvifolia

References

Gentianaceae
Gentianaceae genera